José Casas (born 21 March 1945) is a Spanish former racing cyclist. He rode in the 1971 Tour de France.

References

External links
 

1945 births
Living people
Spanish male cyclists
Place of birth missing (living people)
Sportspeople from Almería
Cyclists from Andalusia